Gunasekar (born 2 June 1964) is an Indian film director and screenwriter known for his works in Telugu cinema. He has directed films in action, romance, mythological, and historical drama genres. He has won a National Film Award, multiple Nandi Awards, and a Filmfare Award South.

Gunasekhar directed the mythological film Ramayanam (1997), which won the National Film Award for Best Children's Film and was screened at the International Children's Film Festival of India. His 2003 action film, Okkadu was huge commercial success becoming the highest grossing Telugu film of that year and was remade into various Indian languages. His other notable films include Sogasu Chooda Tharamaa (1995), Choodalani Vundi (1998), Manoharam (2000), and Rudhramadevi (2015).

Career
Before venturing into mainstream film direction, Gunasekar worked as an associate director to D. V. Narsaraju, Kranthi Kumar, and Ram Gopal Varma. Gunasekhar made his directorial debut with the socio-political Lathi (1992), for which he received the state Nandi Award for Best First Film of a Director.

He directed the super-hit romance film, Sogasu Chooda Tharamaa (1995), which received the Nandi Award for Best Feature Film. In 1997, Gunasekhar directed the mythological film Ramayanam, which won the National Film Award for Best Children's Film and was screened at the International Children's Film Festival of India.

His next film was the action thriller Choodalani Vundi (1998), which introduced the DTS sound to the Telugu screen and was a box-office hit. The film was later remade into Hindi as, Calcutta Mail. He then directed the political thriller, Manoharam (2000), which again bagged the Nandi Award for Best Story, and the Nandi Award for Best Feature Film.

His 2003 action film, Okkadu, was a huge critical and commercial success, becoming the highest grossing Telugu film of that year and was remade into various Indian languages. The 2004 drama film, Arjun, was screened at the International Film Festival of India in the mainstream section.

His latest venture is the historical film, Rudhramadevi which was released in October 2015 to widely mixed reviews but despite that it became an average grosser of the year.

Personal life 
Gunasekher is married to Ragini, and the couple has two daughters – Neelima and Yukhta.

Filmography and awards

References

External links 
home page

Living people
20th-century Indian film directors
Nandi Award winners
Telugu film directors
Filmfare Awards South winners
CineMAA Awards winners
21st-century Indian film directors
Film directors from Andhra Pradesh
People from Visakhapatnam district
Telugu screenwriters
Telugu film producers
Film producers from Andhra Pradesh
Screenwriters from Andhra Pradesh
1964 births
Directors who won the Best Children's Film National Film Award
People from Uttarandhra